Pholiota gummosa, commonly known as the sticky scalycap, is a common species of mushroom-forming fungus in the family Strophariaceae. It is found in Europe and North America, where it grows as a saprotroph on the rotting wood of deciduous trees, including trunks and roots. It can also grow on wood buried near the surface, making it seem as if it is fruiting in grass.

Taxonomy
The fungus was originally described by Wilhelm Gottfried Lasch in 1828, as a member of the genus Agaricus. After being shuffled to several different genera in its taxonomic history, it was transferred to Pholiota by Rolf Singer in 1951.

Description
The crowded gills on the cap underside have an adnate attachment to the stipe. Initially pale yellow, they turn brownish in age as the spores mature. The mushroom makes a brown spore print. Spores are smooth, thin-walled, somewhat bean-shaped (subphaseoliform), and measure 6–8 by 3.5–4.5 µm.

See also
List of Pholiota species

References

External links

Fungi described in 1828
Fungi of Europe
Fungi of North America
Strophariaceae